The North Ings Farm Museum is a working farm museum containing a  narrow gauge railway, running on a circuit of . It is located at Dorrington, between Lincoln and Sleaford, in Lincolnshire. The museum includes agricultural machinery and tractors, commercial vehicles, portable steam pumps and a fairground organ. The collection was opened to the public in 1990.

Locomotive Fleet

Steam Locomotives
1859401 Swift

Internal Combustion Locomotives
Clay Cross Lister Built from Lister spare parts by Clay Cross Co Ltd
Hunslet 6013
Hunslet 7120 Bullfinch
LOD / 758022 Motor Rail 8826 Penelope
Motor Rail 7493
R&H 183773
R&H 200744 Indian Runner
R&H 371937
R&H 375701
R&H 421433
O&K Works number not known

References

External links 
 The Museum website
 
 T.W.F. Hall: The North Ings Farm Railwy. Pages 15–19.

Farm museums in England
Heritage railways in Lincolnshire
Railway museums in England
2 ft gauge railways in England
Museums in Lincolnshire
Technology museums in the United Kingdom